This article lists the results for the Cook Islands national football team.

Key

Key to matches
Att. = Match attendance
(H) = Home ground
(A) = Away ground
(N) = Neutral ground

Key to record by opponent
Pld = Games played
W = Games won
D = Games drawn
L = Games lost
GF = Goals for
GA = Goals against

Results
The Cook Islands' score is shown first in each case.

Notes

Record by opponent

Up to matches played on 17 March 2022.

References

Cook Islands national football team results